The men's moguls competition of the FIS Freestyle World Ski Championships 2011 was held at Deer Valley, United States on February 2, 2011 (qualifications and finals).

35 athletes from 17 countries competed.

Results

Qualification

Final

References

Moguls, men's